George Barker may refer to:

Politics and government
George Barker (British politician) (1858–1936), Member of Parliament for Abertillery, Wales
George Barker (Virginia politician) (born 1951), Member of the Virginia State Senate
George Digby Barker (1833–1914), British soldier and colonial administrator
George P. Barker (1807–1848), New York State Attorney General
George R. Barker (1881–1958), member of the Legislative Assembly of Alberta 1917–1921
George W. Barker (1804–1873), American businessman and public official in Vermont and Wisconsin

Arts and literature
George Barker (painter) (1882–1965), American portrait and landscape painter
George Barker (photographer) (1844–1894), Canadian-American photographer known for his pictures of Niagara Falls
George Barker (poet) (1913–1991), English poet and author
George Arthur Barker (1812–1876), English song composer

Sports
George Barker (cricketer) (1819–1893), English cricketer
George Barker (footballer, born 1875), English footballer
George Barker (footballer, born 1885) (1885–1947), Australian rules footballer
George Barker (footballer, born 1991), English footballer
George Barker (footballer, born 1916) (1916–1993), Australian rules footballer
George H. Barker (1901–?), athlete and coach in Tennessee

Others
George Barker (benefactor) (1776–1845), British scientist and philanthropist
George E. Barker (1930–2014), British philatelist
George Frederick Barker (1835–1910), American scientist and professor
George Robert Barker (1817–1861), British soldier knighted in 1859 for distinguished services during the Indian Mutiny

See also 
George Barker Jeffery (1891–1957), English mathematician
George Baker (disambiguation)